Ellen Louella (Nellie) Powell Thompson (1840–1911) was an American naturalist and botanist, and an active advocate for women's suffrage.

Life 
Ellen Louella (Nellie) Powell Thompson was born in Ohio to parents of English origin. Her siblings included John Wesley Powell, best known for explorations of the American West and leadership of the early US Geological Survey.  Another brother was William P Powell, superintendent of Washington DC public schools.  She had several sisters, one of whom was the wife of Congressman Davis of Kansas, and mother of Arthur Powell Davis, scientist.

In the mid-1850s, Thompson attended Wheaton College in Wheaton, Illinois. She taught school from the age of 16.

On July 8, 1862 in Wheaton, Illinois, she married professor and geographer Almon Harris Thompson, a colleague and friend of her brother John. After the wedding, Thompson continued her work as a teacher, and took her husband's position as superintendent of schools when he entered the army. She spent her 1863 summer vacation at Cairo, Illinois, caring for sick and wounded soldiers from the American Civil War.

Thompson accompanied her husband on expeditions to map the western United States. During this period, she made friends with members of a number of Indian tribes, learning the language of the "Pah Utes" and studying their customs. Thompson was a founding member of the Women's Anthropological Society of America, Washington DC.

The Thompsons had no children.

Thompson died of heart failure, at home while "engaged in household duties", on March 12, 1911.  She is buried in Arlington National Cemetery.

Botany
Thompson joined John Wesley Powell's second Colorado River expedition during their 1872 winter camp near Kanab, Utah, serving as botanist. Her husband Almon Harris Thompson was second in command. She collected plants primarily in the Kanab area, although collecting excursions were also made through southern Utah and northern Arizona. She collected 385 specimens, 15 of which would become type specimens for new taxa.

Every three months, she sent her collections (dried pressed plants) to Dr Asa Gray at Harvard. Many of her specimens reside at the Gray Herbarium, part of Harvard University Herbaria. Some were deposited in the United States National Herbarium in Washington D.C., and others in scattered herbaria across the country.

Thompson also liked to paint, and her home was decorated with many botanical illustrations.

Botanical legacy
Thompson is commemorated in the names of the following plant taxa, which were described as new to science based on specimens she collected in 1872 on John Wesley Powell's second Colorado River expedition:

 Astragalus mollissimus thompsoniae (Astragalus thompsoniae) – Thompson's woolly milkvetch
 Eriogonum thompsoniae thompsoniae – Thompson's buckwheat
 Penstemon thompsoniae (Penstemon pumilus thompsoniae) – Thompson's penstemon
 Peteria thompsoniae – Thompson's spine-noded milkvetch
 Psorothamnus thompsoniae (Parosela thompsoniae) – Thompson's Dalea

Additional plant taxa described as new to science based on specimens she collected on the 1872 expedition include the following:

 Androstephium breviflorum – Pink Funnel Lily
 Astragalus ampullarius – Gumbo Milk-vetch
 Calochortus aureus (Calochortus nuttallii aureus) – Golden Mariposa Lily
 Calochortus flexuosus – Winding Mariposa Lily
 Chylismia multijuga (Oenothera multijuga) – Froststem Suncup
 Dalea flavescens (Petalostemon flavescens) – Canyonlands Prairieclover
 Erigeron utahensis (Erigeron stenophyllus tetrapleuris) – Utah Fleabane
 Fendlerella utahensis (Whipplea utahensis) – Utah Fendlerbush, Yerba Desierto
 Mirabilis glabra (Oxybaphus glaber) – Smooth Four-o'clock
 Psathyrotes pilifera – Hairybeast Turtleback
 Psilostrophe sparsiflora (Riddellia tagetina sparsiflora) – Greenstem Paperflower

Political activism
Thompson was active in the Suffragette movement in the 1890s, and was known across the United States as a colleague of Elizabeth Cady Stanton and Susan B. Anthony. Thompson was elected President of the Women's District Suffrage Association on October 10, 1895, and again in 1897. She was also a founding member of the Equal Suffrage Association of the District of Columbia.

In 1900, Thompson was the chair of the national convention, which ended with a celebration of Susan Anthony's 80th birthday, and retirement from the Presidency of the National Association.  Thompson was active in securing a gift of $200 for Anthony.

References

External links 
UBC Botanical Garden "Botany Photo of the Day" entry
"In the Company of Plants and Rocks" – blog post about Ellen Powell Thompson's botanical contributions
"Women of Capitol Reef" by National Park Service

1840 births
1911 deaths
American people of English descent
Scientists from New York (state)
American suffragists
Wheaton College (Illinois) alumni
People from Wheaton, Illinois
School superintendents in Illinois
19th-century American scientists
20th-century American scientists
American women botanists
20th-century American women scientists